Jambons (from French  'ham') are square pastries filled with cheese and chunks of ham. They are a ubiquitous deli item in Ireland and parts of the UK. The product emerged during the 1990s as part of a broader movement towards "food to go". The multinational bakery company Délifrance claims to have adapted and launched the jambon as a new product in the Irish market in 1997.

Twenty million jambons were purchased by Irish consumers in 2020. Following the trend of meat-free sausage rolls, vegan jambons have also been available since 2020. These pastries are produced in a similar manner, using meat substitutes and cheese analogues for the filling.

In popular culture 
In the RTÉ comedy series Hardy Bucks, one of the main characters, Buzz McDonnell, has an obsession with jambons.

See also

Sausage roll
Puff pastry
Croissant

References

External links
 Jambon recipe – ilovecooking.ie
 Jambon recipe – National Dairy Council

Irish snack foods
Fast food
Street food
Irish cuisine
Pastries
Savoury pies
Ham dishes
Irish meat dishes